Philip Becker (1830–1898) was Mayor of the City of Buffalo, New York, serving 1876–1877 and 1886–1889.  He was born in Oberotterbach, Bavaria, Germany, on April 25, 1830.  He graduated from college in Germany at sixteen years of age. In 1847, Philip and his older brother were provided the means to pay the fare to America and he settled in Buffalo, where his aunt and uncle lived.  In 1852, he married Sarah Goetz.  He entered the retail and wholesale grocery business. A Republican in politics, his election as mayor on November 2, 1875 was followed quickly by his nomination as a delegate to the 1876 Republican National Convention which successfully nominated Rutherford B. Hayes for the presidency. It was also during his first term, in March 1876, that the new County and City Hall was opened. 

Becker was defeated by Solomon Scheu in the election of 1877, but was reelected to a second term in 1885 and to a third in 1887. At the end of his third term, he did not seek re-election.  He returned to his business enterprises and retired in 1893. Becker died on July 4, 1898, with an estate valued over $750,000. He was buried in Forest Lawn Cemetery under a truncated obelisk of polished black Quincy granite crafted by McDonnell & Sons which, at a weight of 48 tons, was the largest such piece of polished stone ever to have been manufactured at the time.

Becker is arguably most historically notable as a pioneer in, and champion of, German culture in Buffalo. Not only was he the first German-American to be elected as the city's mayor, but he was also instrumental in organizing the Buffalo German Insurance Company in 1867, serving as its president from 1869 until his death, and during the period between his first and second terms championed the construction of the Buffalo Music Hall on Main Street and the selection of Buffalo as the site of the 1883 German Sängerfest.

Gallery

References

1830 births
1898 deaths
People from Südliche Weinstraße
New York (state) Republicans
Mayors of Buffalo, New York
Burials at Forest Lawn Cemetery (Buffalo)
German emigrants to the United States
People from the Palatinate (region)
19th-century American politicians